Krish is an Indian actor and singer who has worked on Tamil and Telugu films. He was introduced to the Tamil Cinema as a playback singer by the successful duos Gautham Vasudev Menon and Harris Jayaraj in Vettaiyaadu Vilaiyaadu for the song "Manjal Veyyil". After beginning his career as a playback singer, he has also appeared in films as an actor.

Career
Krish was born in Tiruchirappalli, Tamil Nadu, India, but shifted to New York City after his father, a banker, had moved abroad on a posting. He thus shifted schools and spent 15 years in the United States. During his time in New York City, Krish worked as an assistant on the sets of The Cosby Show and National Treasure: Book of Secrets (2004), helping the teams conduct pre-production works. He also completed an acting course at the New York Film Academy and performed at the Broadway in a Walt Disney production of Aladdin, before arriving in Chennai, hoping to get a breakthrough in the industry as an actor.

During the initial months of his return to Chennai, Krish participated in stage shows and cultural events as a singer and was recruited by composer Ganesh Kumar to sing a western song for an album. Ganesh passed over Krish's details to music composer Harris Jayaraj. Krish then made his playback singing debut in Tamil films by rendering the song "Manjal Veiyil" from Vettaiyaadu Vilaiyaadu (2006), composed by Harris Jayaraj, alongside Hariharan. He subsequently collaborated with the composer on several other critically acclaimed songs including "June Ponal July Kaatru" from Unnale Unnale (2007), "Sakiyae" from Dhaam Dhoom, "Oru Mugamo" from Bheema and "Adiye Kolluthey" from Vaaranam Aayiram (2008). His work saw him garner multiple Filmfare Award nominations, as well as securing a Vijay Award for Best Singer. He has also featured as a lyricist, penning two songs for the romantic comedy Kandaen (2011).

Film-makers from the Tamil film industry had offered Krish roles as an actor in their ventures, but he was insistent that he would only portray the lead role. He turned down the opportunity from K. V. Anand to play the well-received supporting role portrayed by Ajmal in Ko (2011), though he later played a small role as himself in a song from the film. Producer Ibrahim Rowther spotted Krish in the song "Aga Naga" and offered him the chance of portraying the lead role in his production Puriyadha Anandam Puthithaga Arambam. The film, a romantic love story featuring him alongside Srushti Dange, began shooting in late 2012, but was only released in June 2015. The film had a low key opening, and garnered negative reviews. In June 2015, he also released an independent six-track music album, with compositions by Vijay Ebenezer and videos featuring Nikesha Patel. He had worked alongside Ebenezer for two years for the project, with the song "Maaya" from the album being heavily promoted.

Personal life
Krish married actress Sangeetha at a private ceremony at Annamalaiyar Temple in Tiruvannamalai on 1 February 2009. The pair's daughter, Shiviya, was born in December 2012.

Filmography

Discography 
As singer

As composer
Magarasi (Sun TV)
Raame Aandalum Raavane Aandalum

References

Male actors in Tamil cinema
Tamil singers
Living people
Telugu playback singers
Tamil playback singers
Kannada playback singers
Indian male playback singers
Musicians from Tiruchirappalli
1977 births